XR-SAM (eXtra-long Range Surface to Air Missile) is an Indian long-range mobile surface to air missile defence system under development by Defence Research and Development Organization (DRDO).

It will supplement the Indo-Israeli Barak 8 and Russian  S-400 missile system in the Indian armed forces.

Design

The missile system might used to bridge the gap between MR-SAM (70 km) and S-400 (250 km). The missile system will have a range of 250 km against fighter jets, 350 km against cruise missiles, sea skimming anti-ship missiles, AWACS and mid air refuelers and will be capable of bringing down ballistic missiles and stealth fighters in the terminal stage. The naval version of the missile might be also developed to supplement the LR-SAM missile in the Indian Navy.

Operators

 Indian Army — Planned
 Indian Navy — Planned
 Indian Air Force — Planned

See also

 Akash-NG
 Ashwin Ballistic Missile Interceptor / AAD
 HQ-9
 David's Sling
 MIM-104 Patriot
 RIM-174 Standard ERAM (SM-6)
 Terminal High Altitude Area Defense (THAAD)
 S-400 missile
 S-500 missile

References 

Surface-to-air missiles of India
Post–Cold War weapons of India
Defence Research and Development Organisation